Full Swing is the debut EP from Cornish Folk Punk band Crowns. A six-track EP recorded and released 2012.

"Kissing Gates" was the first single released from the EP in November 2011, followed by Full Swing in February 2012.

Track listing

Personnel
Crowns
 Bill Jefferson - vocals/guitar
 Jake Butler - bass/backing vocals
 Jack Speckleton - mandolin/backing vocals
 Nathan Haynes - drums/backing vocals

References

2012 debut EPs
Crowns (band) albums